Mugurel Dumitru is a retired Romanian association football forward who played professionally in the USISL A-League.

In 1998, Dumitru moved to the United States to play for the Silicon Valley Ambassadors of the USISL Pro Development League.  In 1999, he moved to the San Diego Flash of the USISL A-League.  In April 2001, the Flash ceased operations due to financial problems.    The league took control of the team and financed its operations through the end of the season.  However, several Flash players left  the team, including Dumitru who moved to the El Paso Patriots where he finished his American career.

References

External links
Profile at Soccerstats.us

Living people
1972 births
Romanian footballers
Romanian expatriate footballers
Expatriate soccer players in the United States
Romanian expatriate sportspeople in the United States
El Paso Patriots players
Silicon Valley Ambassadors players
San Diego Flash players
A-League (1995–2004) players
USL League Two players
Association football forwards